Prionurus laticlavius is a tropical fish found in coral reefs in the eastern central Pacific Ocean. It is commonly known as the razor surgeonfish. It is sometimes used in aquariums.

References

Prionurus
Fish described in 1846